Due to adverse weather conditions, the 2015 inter-provincials did not take place.

The 2015 GAA Interprovincial Championships (known also as the Railway Cup) was a senior GAA competition in which all 4 provinces of Ireland compete in Gaelic football and hurling tournaments. The provincial squads are made up of players from county panels in each respective province.

Connacht were the reigning football champions whilst Leinster were  the reigning hurling champions.

Football championship

Fixtures

Semi-finals

Final

Hurling championship

Fixtures

Semi-finals

Final

References
 Results and fixtures

GAA Interprovincial Championship
I
I
GAA